Patrizia Viotti (1950–1994) was an Italian glamour model and film actress.

She first gained attention in 1969 through her relationship with the singer Mal Ryder, who she met at the Piper Club in Rome. On the back of this, she starred in several erotic-themed films from 1971. However her drug addiction led to the end of her film career in 1974, and two brief spells in prison.

Her sister Piera Viotti was also an actress.

Filmography
 Erika (1971)
 The Night of the Damned (1971)
 Amuck! (1972)
 Canterbury proibito (1972)
 La morte scende leggera (1972)
 The Ribald Decameron (1972)
 Charley's Nieces (1974)

References

Bibliography 
 Curti, Roberto. Italian Gothic Horror Films, 1970-1979. McFarland, 2017.

External links 
 

1950 births
1994 deaths
Italian film actresses
Glamour models
Models from Rome
Actresses from Rome